Coyote is a 2007 independent film created by Brian Petersen and Brett Spackman.

After a friend's son is deported to Mexico, the two main characters smuggle him back into the United States. After seeing the desperate plight and unscrupulous people who are generally involved in smuggling people into the United States, the friends decide to apply business principles to the issue. They set up a business venture to smuggle more people in for profit, becoming coyote smugglers. The movie chronicles the events that occur as the business venture begins to unravel.

The film was produced by Devin Colvin and Chris Wyatt and did a successful festival run in 2008, garnering 7 awards including "Best Film" at both the Big Bear Lake International Film Festival and at the TriMedia Film Festival, and "Best Actor" for Petersen (who also plays a lead role) at the San Diego Film Festival.

Plot
Encouraged by the lack of trouble they experienced while transporting a recently deported friend back into the United States from Mexico, longtime pals J and Steve decide to form a company dedicated to a kinder, gentler brand of people smuggling. The border agents in Nogales were positively gullible and the Minutemen were nowhere to be found, leading the two naïve Americans to suspect that they can run a profitable scheme by helping desperate Mexicans gain illegal entry into the United States. It isn't long before the true coyotes discover what's been happening right under their noses, and J and Steve learn the real perils of crossing boundaries.

References

External links 
 
 
 Coyote review from offoffoff.com

2007 films
American drama films
American independent films
2000s English-language films
2000s American films